The Grand Rapids Gold are an American professional basketball team in the NBA G League based in Grand Rapids, Michigan, and are affiliated with the Denver Nuggets. The Gold play their home games at Van Andel Arena. They began play as the Anaheim Arsenal in 2006, before relocating to Springfield, Massachusetts, in 2009, becoming the Springfield Armor. After five seasons in Springfield, the franchise moved to Grand Rapids in 2014 and were subsequently renamed the Grand Rapids Drive, before changing their name again to the Gold in 2021.

Franchise history

2006–2009: Anaheim Arsenal
The franchise began in 2006 as the Anaheim Arsenal as an expansion team in the NBA Development League (NBA D-League). Based in Anaheim, California, and playing at the Anaheim Convention Center, the Arsenal were an affiliate of the Atlanta Hawks, Los Angeles Clippers, Orlando Magic and Portland Trail Blazers. However, the Arsenal era was mainly marked by futility, never having a winning season or a playoff berth. On March 31, 2009, the Arsenal announced that they would relocate to Springfield, Massachusetts.

2009–2014: Springfield Armor
On July 29, 2009, it was announced that Dee Brown would become the head coach. On September 2, the Armor picked first in the 2009 NBA Development League Expansion Draft, selecting center Marcus Campbell. The team ended their inaugural 2009–10 season with a record of 7–43 (.140), the worst record in D-League history. They also became the first (and so far only) team to lose every road game, as they went 0–25. No team won less than 20% of their games until the 2019-20 Northern Arizona Suns (.190); the 2020-21 Iowa Wolves broke the dubious record by going 2–13 for a percentage of .133.

During the 2010–11 season, the Armor started by picking fifth in the D-League Draft, and selected La Salle's Vernon Goodridge. The Armor would end up finishing with a record of 13–37, sixth in the seven-team Eastern Conference. After the season, head coach Dee Brown opted to leave the team to join the Detroit Pistons. Brown was replaced soon after by Bob MacKinnon Jr. During the 2010–11 season, the team was an affiliate of the New Jersey Nets, New York Knicks and Philadelphia 76ers.

For the 2011–12 season, the Armor entered into a single affiliation partnership with the Brooklyn Nets, giving the Nets full control over the basketball operations of and making them the sole affiliate for the Armor. The Nets became the second NBA team to enter into a single affiliation with an NBA D-League team, joining the Houston Rockets and the Rio Grande Valley Vipers.

2014–2021: Grand Rapids Drive
On April 15, 2014, it was announced that the SSJ Group purchased the Springfield Armor and would relocate the team to Grand Rapids, Michigan for the 2014–15 season. The Grand Rapids franchise would be locally owned and established a single-franchise "hybrid" affiliation with the Detroit Pistons. The affiliation between the Pistons and the Drive was the third between the two cities as the Detroit Red Wings of the National Hockey League and the Grand Rapids Griffins of the American Hockey League also share an affiliation, as do the Detroit Tigers of the American League and the West Michigan Whitecaps of the Midwest League.

The team launched a name-the-team contest shortly after the formal announcement. The contest produced four finalists: Drive, Chairmen, Horsepower, and Blue Racers. The community was encouraged to vote online in order to determine which of the four names would become the official team name. Out of those names, the Grand Rapids Drive was selected.

On July 29, 2020, the Pistons announced that the organization had officially purchased the Northern Arizona Suns from the Phoenix Suns and were relocating the franchise to Detroit for the 2021–22 season. It was also announced that the affiliation between the Pistons and Drive would end after the 2020–21 season. The ownership of the Drive were stated as looking for an option to continue operations once the affiliation was set to end of after the 2020–21 season. The Drive would be one of several G League teams to opt out of the single-site shortened season held in Orlando. On January 8, 2021, the Drive stated they were negotiating with a new affiliate and could include a new name and logo.

2021–present: Grand Rapids Gold
On April 27, 2021, the Drive announced a new affiliation agreement with the Denver Nuggets. As part of the new affiliation, the Drive were rebranded as the Grand Rapids Gold, with the name, logo and color scheme announced on July 7. The organization operates under a hybrid model with the Nuggets controlling the basketball operations and SSJ Group, with Steve Jbara as owner and president, controlling the team's business operations and community engagement. On August 19, the Gold named Jason Terry as its new head coach.

With the DeltaPlex Arena set to close before the start of the 2022-23 season, the Gold announced on June 2, 2022 that they had signed a five-year lease with Van Andel Arena to serve as their new home.

Season-by-season

Current roster

Head coaches

NBA affiliates

Anaheim Arsenal
Atlanta Hawks (2006–2009)
Los Angeles Clippers (2006–2009)
Orlando Magic (2006–2008)
Portland Trail Blazers (2006–2007)

Springfield Armor
New Jersey / Brooklyn Nets (2009–2014)
New York Knicks (2009–2011)
Philadelphia 76ers (2009–2011)

Grand Rapids Drive
Detroit Pistons (2014–2021)

Grand Rapids Gold
Denver Nuggets (2021–present)

References

External links
Official team website

 
Basketball teams established in 2006
Basketball teams in Michigan
Events in Grand Rapids, Michigan
Sports in Grand Rapids, Michigan
2006 establishments in California